"The Decision" is the 23rd television play episode of the first season of the Australian anthology television series Australian Playhouse. "The Decision" was written by John Warwick and directed by Oscar Whitbread and originally aired on ABC on 19 September 1966.

Plot
When public opinion collides with private beliefs in a small town, the result is a tragedy of in tolerance that destroys. A woman is seriously injured in a car accident and requires a blood transfusion, but she refuses on religious grounds. She passes out and the doctor pleads with her husband to give permission. He refuses and the woman dies. The husband is blamed for the wife's death and is shunned by the neighbours.

Cast
 Terry McDermott as the husband Ben Peters
 Patsy King as the wife Sally Peters
 Jon Ewing as Dr Dawkins
 George Mallaby
 Rosalind Seagrave as Nurse Andrews
 Roly Baree as a shopkeeper friend Perry
 Moira Carleton as the disapproving neighbour Mrs Jennings

Reception
The Age called it "an excellent illustration of careful and sustained characterisation... a rare combination of good acting, good writing and good direction."

See also
 List of television plays broadcast on Australian Broadcasting Corporation (1960s)

References

External links
 
 
 

1966 television plays
1966 Australian television episodes
1960s Australian television plays
Australian Playhouse (season 1) episodes
Black-and-white television episodes